Alwyne Wilks (4 September 1906 – 1980) was an English professional footballer who played as a winger for Sunderland.

References

1906 births
1980 deaths
People from the Borough of Harrogate
English footballers
Association football wingers
Brodsworth Main Colliery F.C. players
Doncaster Rovers F.C. players
Sunderland A.F.C. players
Reading F.C. players
Barrow A.F.C. players
Loughborough Corinthians F.C. players
Owston Park Rangers F.C. players
English Football League players